Melvin Coleman (January 1, 1911 – April 22, 1968) was an American Negro league shortstop in the 1930s.

A native of Charlotte, North Carolina, Coleman played for the Birmingham Black Barons in 1937. In 19 recorded games for Birmingham, he posted 18 hits in 65 plate appearances. Coleman later had a brief stint with the Atlanta Black Crackers in 1944. He died in Charlotte, North Carolina in 1968 at age 57.

References

External links
Baseball statistics and player information from Baseball-Reference Black Baseball Stats and Seamheads

1911 births
1968 deaths
Atlanta Black Crackers players
Birmingham Black Barons players
Baseball shortstops
Baseball players from Charlotte, North Carolina